The Exchange Place Historic District in Downtown Salt Lake City, Utah, United States is a historic district that was listed on the National Register of Historic Places in 1978.  It included ten contributing buildings and three non-contributing buildings on a  area, with significance dating to 1903.

Its oldest building in the NRHP nomination was the Federal Building and Post Office, which had been built during 1903–06.  That building was renamed in 1990 as the Frank E. Moss United States Courthouse.

In addition, the original nomination for the NRHP included the Felt Building (1909), Newhouse Realty Building (1917), Boston and Newhouse Buildings (1910), Federal Building and Post Office (1906), Salt Lake Stock and Mining Exchange Building (1908), Commercial Club Building (1908), New Grand Hotel (1910), Hotel Plandome (1905), and the now-demolished Hotel Newhouse (1912). The Sullivanesque Felt Building was designed by Richard K.A. Kletting, who designed many buildings around Salt Lake City such as the McIntyre Building farther north on Main Street and the Utah State Capitol. Other buildings included in the district boundaries today include the New York Hotel (1906), which today houses Market Street Grill, and the Judge Building (1907).

See also

 National Register of Historic Places listings in Salt Lake City

References

External links

Buildings and structures completed in 1903
Geography of Salt Lake City
Historic districts on the National Register of Historic Places in Utah
National Register of Historic Places in Salt Lake City